Baron Feofil Egorovich (von) Meyendorf (4 August 1838 – 18 October 1919) was an Imperial Russian military leader of Baltic German descent. He fought in the Caucasus and against the Ottoman Empire and the Empire of Japan.

Awards
Order of Saint Stanislaus (House of Romanov), 3rd class, 1861
Order of Saint Anna, 3rd class, 1861
Order of Saint Stanislaus (House of Romanov), 2nd class, 1862
Order of Saint Vladimir, 4th class, 1869
Order of Saint Vladimir, 3rd class, 1870
Order of Saint Stanislaus (House of Romanov), 1st class, 1878
Gold Sword for Bravery, 1878
Order of Saint Anna, 1st class, 1883
Order of Saint Vladimir, 2nd class, 1889
Order of the White Eagle (Russian Empire), 1894
Order of Saint Alexander Nevsky, 1901
2nd Gold Sword for Bravery, 1905
Order of Saint George, 4th degree, 1908
Order of Saint Vladimir, 1st class, 1910

Children
son Nikolai Meyendorff (1887-1969)

References

Sources
 
 
 Милорадович Г. А. Список лиц свиты их величеств с царствования императора Петра I по 1886 год. СПб., 1886
 Список генералам по старшинству на 1886 год. СПб., 1886

1838 births
1919 deaths
People of the Caucasian War
Russian military personnel of the Russo-Turkish War (1877–1878)
Russian military personnel of the Russo-Japanese War
Recipients of the Order of Saint Stanislaus (Russian), 3rd class
Recipients of the Order of St. Anna, 3rd class
Recipients of the Order of Saint Stanislaus (Russian), 2nd class
Recipients of the Order of St. Vladimir, 4th class
Recipients of the Order of St. Vladimir, 3rd class
Recipients of the Order of Saint Stanislaus (Russian), 1st class
Recipients of the Gold Sword for Bravery
Recipients of the Order of St. Anna, 1st class
Recipients of the Order of St. Vladimir, 2nd class
Recipients of the Order of the White Eagle (Russia)
Recipients of the Order of St. Vladimir, 1st class
Russian Imperial Hussars officers